Westhall Wood and Meadow is a  biological Site of Special Scientific Interest south of Rickinghall in Suffolk.

The wood is ancient coppice with standards with mainly pedunculate oak and hornbeams dominant in the coppice layer. The unimproved meadow is poorly drained and species rich, with grasses including red fescue and Yorkshire fog.

The site is private land with no public access.

References

Sites of Special Scientific Interest in Suffolk